Dr Cedric Namedi Phatudi (27 May 1912 – 7 October 1987) was the Chief Minister of Lebowa, one of the South African bantustans.

Early life
Born in Ga-Mphahlele, the son of the chief of the Mphahlele tribe. He earned his basic education in mission schools.

Education
Phatudi initially worked as a teacher and educational administrator before attending the University of Fort Hare, gaining a BA in 1947 and a teaching diploma in 1950 at the University of the Witwatersrand, graduating with a BEd in 1965. It was during this time that he made his contributions to the Sepedi language. He authored and co-authored a few books in Sepedi. He is also known to have translated some of Shakespeare's works into Sepedi.

Books: Lehlabile Series, co-authored with G.O. Mojapelo : , published by Educum. He was also awarded an Honorary Doctorate from the University of the North in 1973, after which Phatudi encouraged others to use the Dr prefix wherever possible when referring to him. Phatudi served as President of the Federation of Inspectors of Schools in South Africa from 1958 to 1969.

Chief Minister of Lebowa
Phatudi became involved in the nascent Lebowa nation building exercise and had risen in prominence to the extent that when Lebowa was granted self-government on 2 October 1972, Phatudi was appointed Minister for Education before his election as Chief Minister on 8 May 1973. Not one for wasting time settling into the role, Phatudi had been Chief Minister for one day when he informed the South African government that if Lebowa was to become self-sufficient then substantial tracts of South Africa, including a number of white towns, would need to be added to Lebowa territory. The statement was not well received in Pretoria, although they did eventually transfer several small tracts of land to Lebowa.

The earlier outburst aside, Phatudi was considered the most tactful of the bantustan leaders, with a modus operandi directed more at calm negotiations with Pretoria and dissident bodies than the angry outbursts epitomised by leaders like the Transkei's Kaiser Matanzima. However, when these failed, Phatudi was not above unleashing his police against political opponents.

Economic problems continued to plague Lebowa however and Phatudi struggled to maintain control over the increasingly disgruntled homeland population throughout his rule. Phatudi died in office in 1987.

He was succeeded by Noko Nelson Ramodike from Tzaneen. Lebowa itself only lasted another seven years before its reintegration into Transvaal. Phatudi also successfully negotiated that Es'kia Mphahlele, who was then a prohibited person, be allowed back into the country. After this success, he later also attempted to negotiate the release of Nelson Mandela, but unfortunately this was not realised.

References

1912 births
1987 deaths
Northern Sotho people
Chief ministers of South African bantustans
University of Fort Hare alumni
University of the Witwatersrand alumni